Tjuvfjordlaguna is a lagoon at Edgeøya, Svalbard. It is located just inside the head of Tjuvfjorden, at the southeast side of the valley Dyrdalen, and northwest of Schneiderberget. The glacier Deltabreen debouches into the lagoon.

References

Bodies of water of Svalbard
Lagoons of Norway
Edgeøya